Theofiel ("Theo") Middelkamp (23 February  1914 – 2 May 2005) was a Dutch road cyclist. In 1947, Middelkamp became world champion. In 1936, he was the first Dutch cyclist ever to win a stage in the Tour de France.

Biography
Middelkamp was born as the second son in a family of nine children. At an early age, he wanted to be a footballer, but he soon realised that there was much more money to be earned in cycling, as football was not yet a professional sport in the Netherlands.

Middelkamp was the first Dutchman to win a stage in the Tour de France. When he came to the Tour, he had never even seen mountains, coming from the very flat parts of the Netherlands. However, in his first Tour, on 14 July 1936, he won the difficult mountain stage from Aix-les-Bains to Grenoble, which went over the Col du Galibier. That year, he finished 23rd overall. In 1937 he had to quit the Tour because of a fall, in which he broke a finger.

In 1938 he won the seventh stage (Bayonne-Pau). In that tour, he won 8,000 francs, much less than he could have earned in races in Flanders, and so he decided not to participate in any later Tours. As Middelkamp famously said, "I cannot live on fame and honour".

During the Second World War, Middelkamp earned money by smuggling, but he was caught and spent several months in prison. After the war, he went back to full-time cycling.

In 1947, Middelkamp became the first Dutch world champion on the road, in Reims, after having been close to that title in the previous year.

Middelkamp ended his career in 1951, when he bought a pub in Kieldrecht. For a long time, he would not talk to journalists about his cycling years, until he spoke about his famous 1936 stage win in a television program in 2003. Middelkamp died in 2005.

Major results

1935
 5th Kampioenschap van Vlaanderen
1936
 1st GP Stad Vilvoorde
 1st Stage 7 Tour de France
 3rd  Road race, UCI Road World Championships
1938
 1st  Road race, National Road Championships
 1st Stage 7 Tour de France
1943
 1st  Road race, National Road Championships
1944
 2nd Grand Prix Jules Lowie
 3rd Road race, National Road Championships
1945
 1st  Road race, National Road Championships
 1st Nationale Sluitingsprijs
 10th Circuit des Onze Villes
1946
 2nd Road race, National Road Championships
 10th Scheldeprijs
1947
 1st  Road race, UCI Road World Championships
 3rd Scheldeprijs
1948
 1st GP Stad Vilvoorde
 3rd Road race, National Road Championships
 3rd Scheldeprijs
1950
 2nd  Road race, UCI Road World Championships
 10th Overall Ronde van Nederland

Grand Tour general classification results timeline

References

External links 

Official Tour de France results for Theo Middelkamp

1914 births
2005 deaths
Dutch male cyclists
Dutch Tour de France stage winners
UCI Road World Champions (elite men)
People from Hulst
UCI Road World Championships cyclists for the Netherlands
Cyclists from Zeeland